Rosa Campbell Praed (26 March 1851 – 10 April 1935), often credited as Mrs. Campbell Praed (and also known as Rosa Caroline Praed), was an Australian novelist in the 19th and early 20th centuries. Her large bibliography covered multiple genres, and books for children as well as adults. She has been described as the first Australian novelist to achieve a significant international reputation.

Early life

Rosa Murray-Prior was born on 26 March 1851 in Bromelton in the Moreton Bay area of Queensland, Australia. She was the third child of Thomas Murray-Prior (1819–1892) and Matilda Harpur. Her father was born in England and went to Sydney in May 1839. He afterwards took up grazing country in Queensland and became a member of the then colony's Legislative Council. He was postmaster-general in the second Robert Herbert ministry in 1866, in the Robert Ramsay Mackenzie ministry, 1867-8, and the Arthur Hunter Palmer ministry, 1870-4, and was elected chairman of committees in the council in July 1889. After Matilda's death in 1868, he married Nora C. Barton, aunt of the poet Andrew Barton “Banjo” Paterson.

Praed was brought up on stations in the Burnett River district until the age of seven, at which time the family "moved following the massacre by Aborigines of the Fraser family at Hornet Bank station and the retaliatory massacre of Aborigines by whites". They resettled in Brisbane, where Murray-Prior bought a banana plantation in Ormiston.

Rosa had a passion for reading and writing from childhood. She was primarily self-taught; her grandmother taught her to read and her mother encouraged her love of books. Many of her early experiences were used for the political and social life of her early books. Spender writes that the trials and tribulations experienced by her mother not only made her "determine that she would never succumb to the same fate" but that they "resurfaced repeatedly in her subsequent novels".

Her mother died in 1868 and, as the eldest daughter, Praed became the mistress of her father's house and his hostess when he entertained. This gave her access "to the social and political discourse" of the colony, and provided more experiences which she used in her later books, such as Policy and Passion (1881).

On 29 October 1872 she married Arthur Campbell Praed, a nephew of the poet Winthrop Mackworth Praed. She lived with him on his property on Curtis Island, "an existence of terrifying hardship and loneliness". Spender disagrees with the critical commentary on Praed which dismisses her as a middle-class woman writer of Anglo-Australian fiction. She says that "The years which she spent on Curtis Island and which played such a crucial part in determining her values – and her voice – could hardly be described as middle-class, indulgent or privileged". She recreates her life at this time in her novel, An Australian Heroine (1880). It was also during her time on Curtis Island that she turned to spiritualism. She later wrote many novels about psychic phenomena and the supernatural.

Rosa and her husband had two children, Maud, who was deaf, and Bulkley, in Australia, and two more sons, Humphrey and Geoffrey, after their move to England.

Move to England
In 1876, after the failure of the cattle station, the Praeds moved to England where Rosa established herself as a writer. Except for a visit to Australia in 1894–95, England was henceforth her home.

Her marriage was not a successful one and, within a few years of their arrival in England, Praed decided, due to her husband's extramarital affairs, to live a separate life.

Later life and literary career
1880 she published her first book, An Australian Heroine, which had been twice returned to her for revision by Chapman and Hall's reader, George Meredith; he probably gave her advice of great value. It was well-reviewed and established her as an author. This book was followed by Policy and Passion (1881), one of the best of her earlier books, which went into at least three editions. An Australian reprint was issued in 1887 under the title of Longleat of Kooralbyn. Nadine; the Study of a Woman, was published in 1882, Moloch; a Story of Sacrifice, in 1883, and Zero; a story of Monte Carlo, in 1884.

As her fame grew, the Praeds moved from Northamptonshire to London. Celebrities such as the writers Oscar Wilde, Rudyard Kipling and Bram Stoker visited them. They also mixed with playwrights, actors such as Ellen Terry, painters, artists, politicians and people interested in occultism and theosophy. She also met another expatriate Australian, the artist Mortimer Menpes.

In 1884 she began her friendship with Irish politician, historian and writer, Justin McCarthy, a friendship which continued for the rest of his life. He was 20 years her senior, with an established reputation as a literary man. They collaborated on three political novels, The Right Honourable (1886), The Rebel Rose (issued anonymously in 1888, but two later editions appeared in their joint names under the title The Rival Princess ), and The Ladies' Gallery (1888). Another joint work was The Grey River (1889), a large-format book on the Thames, illustrated with etchings by Mortimer Menpes. Clarke describes it as "an early example of the 'coffee-table' genre". Around this time, Menpes, at Praed's request, also decorated her house and gave art lessons to her daughter, Maud. Although Praed encouraged her daughter's artistic skills, using some of her drawings to illustrate her works, Maud was admitted to a mental asylum in the late 1890s and remained there until her death in 1941.

In 1894–95, she returned to Australia, visiting Japan on her return to England. As a result of this visit, she wrote Madame Izàn: A Tourist Story (1899) in which she "raised the then daring subject of an interracial marriage between a Japanese man and an Irish woman".

In 1899, she began collaborating with medium Nancy Harward, with whom she lived for thirty years. During this time she wrote her novels about the occult and reincarnation, starting with Nyria (1904).

Praed's husband died in 1901, and in 1902 she published My Australian Girlhood, an account of her life in the country before her marriage. It contains many interesting memories, especially those relating to the aborigines. After a friendship of nearly 30 years Justin McCarthy died in April 1912. Towards the end of that year Praed published Our Book of Memories: Letters of Justin McCarthy to Mrs Campbell Praed, with connecting explanations.

Her last years were spent at Torquay. In 1931 she published The Soul of Nyria, which purports to be an intimate account of life in Rome over 1800 years ago as set down by a modern woman in a mediumistic state. This record was written down by her between 1899 and 1903, but was not published until nearly 30 years later. Her novel, Nyria, was based on these experiences.

She died at Torquay on 10 April 1935 and was survived by her daughter who later died in a mental asylum. Her three sons predeceased her, all through violent deaths – a car accident, a hunting accident, and suicide.

Reviewing her life, Spender suggests that "her success is all the more remarkable given that she achieved [it] without benefit of privilege, patronage, a full purse or a formal education".

Praed Place in the Canberra suburb of Garran is named in her honour.

Literary style and themes
Praed never lost her interest in her native country and though most of her life was passed in England, a large proportion of her novels were based on her Australian experiences. Others dealt with the occult, with spiritualism, or with abnormal states of mind. She was much interested in psychological problems, her character-drawing is good although her women are better than her men, she had some sense of humour, and she could tell a story. Rosa Praed has been claimed as "the first Australian-born novelist to achieve a significant international reputation".

Spender argues that Praed "made a virtue of being Australian", and gave her English audience novels that were "racy, exotic and on the provocative fringes of polite Victorian fiction". In addition, Spender says, her writing was "extraordinary" at the time not only for her inclusion of Australian Aboriginal people as characters in her novels but for "eloquently pleading their case for justice and dignity". In My Australian Girlhood, for example, she writes "There has been no-one to write the Blacks' epic: not many have said words in their defence; and this is but a poor little plea I lay down for my old friends".

As well as exploring indigenous issues, Praed documents in her novels "a female perspective on the Australian bush", demonstrating her conviction that women could not achieve "a decent life". As she wrote in The Luck of the Leura, "The woman always pays ... In spite of her husband's protestations, and to his genuine distress, she had to do all those things which he had declared should never be required of her". Spender argues that the similarities between the Brenda of this book and Praed's mother are "impossible to ignore". However, she says that Praed does not endlessly copy her mother, creating instead "realistic characters" through which she generalised about the experience of women in the bush. Many of her heroines, too, confronted the question of whether to marry. In The Bond of Wedlock (1887) she explores violent marriage, and in Nadine: The Study of a Woman (1882) she looks at what a woman can do when she has a child and no husband.

Regardless of the specific subject matter of her novels, Praed generally had some point to make "about the human condition and the organisation of society".

Bibliography
Source:

Novels

 An Australian Heroine (1880)
 Policy and Passion (1881)
 Nadine : The Study of a Woman (1882)
 Moloch : A Story of Sacrifice (1883)
 Zero : A story of Monte Carlo (1884)
 The Head Station (1885)
 Affinities: A Romance of To-day (1885)
 Miss Jacobsen's Chance (1886)
 The Right Honorable (1886)
 The Brother of the Shadow (1886)
 The Bond of Wedlock (1887) mounted as a play on Broadway stage (Opera Comique) as Ariane (1888, co-written with Richard Lee)<ref>Ariane, Review, The Stage</ref>
 The Ladies' Gallery (1888)
 The Rebel Rose (1888)
 The Soul of Countess Adrian (1888)
 The Romance of a Station (1889)
 The Romance of a Chalet (1892)
 December Roses (1892)
 Christina Chard (1893)
 Outlaw and Lawmaker (1893)
 Mrs Tregaskiss (1895)
 Nùlma (1897)
 The Scourge-Stick (1898)
 Madame Izan (1899)
 As a Watch in the Night (1901)
 The Insane Root (1902)
 The Other Mrs Jacobs (1903)
 Fugitive Anne, A Romance of the Australian Bush (1903)
 The Ghost (1903)
 Some Loves and a Life (1904)
 Nyria (1904)
 The Maid of the River (1905)
 The Lost Earl of Ellan (1906)
 By Their Fruits (1908)
 The Romance of Mademoiselle Aïssé (1910)
 Opal Fire (1910)
 The Body of His Desire (1912)
 The Mystery Woman (1913) 
 Lady Bridget in the Never-Never Land (1915)
 Sister Sorrow (1916)

Short story collections

 Australian Life: Black and White (1885)
 Dwellers by the River (1902)
 The Luck of the Leura (1907)
 Stubble Before the wind (1908)
 A Summer Wreath (1909)
 The Bunyip (1891)

Poetry collection

 Seven Christmas Eves (1899)

Autobiography

 My Australian Girlhood (1902)

Correspondence

 Our Book of Memories : Letters of Justin McCarthy to Mrs Campbell Praed (1912)

 See also 
 Mrs. Praed and Theosophy

Notes

References

Book Search, a page from the National Library of Australia website describing books the Library wishes to acquire.  Includes biographical details of Mrs Praed.  Accessed 26 April 2006
Clarke, Patricia "In the Steps of Rosa Praed and Tasma: Biographical Trails", Lecture given by Patricia Clarke, author of  Rosa!  Rosa! A Life of Rosa Praed, Novelist and Spiritualist Accessed 26 April 2006
Clarke, Patricia (1988) Pen Portraits: Women Writers and Journalists in Nineteenth Century Australia, Sydney, Allen & Unwin
Clarke, Patricia (2003) "Two colonials in London's Bohemia" in National Library of Australia News, XIII(12): 14–17, September 2003
North, Marilla "Eighty-four amazing years", Review of Patricia Clarke's biography of Rosa Praed, Rosa! Rosa! Accessed 26 April 2006.

Spender, Dale (1988) "Rosa Praed: Original Australian Writer" in Adelaide, Debra (ed) (1988) A Bright and Fiery Troop, Ringwood, Penguin
Tiffin, Chris (1988) "Praed, Rosa Caroline (1851–1935)" in Australian Dictionary of Biography, online edition
Wilde, W., Hooton, J. & Andrews, B (1994) The Oxford Companion of Australian Literature'' 2nd ed. South Melbourne, Oxford University Press

External links
 
 
 
 Mrs. Campbell Praed, The Online Books Page, University of Pennsylvania
 Bibliography of works by Rosa Praed at Freeread
 Chris Tiffin – Rosa Praed – Victorian Fiction Research Guide
 Read Chapter 1 of Fugitive Anne from the Lost Worlds Australia Anthology.
 The Insane Root by Mrs Campbell Praed, stored online at horrormasters.com, now in public domain.
 Policy and Passion by Rosa Praed, on the Project Gutenberg Australia Website
 Rosa Campbell Praed, selected bibliography
 Len Platt '"Altogether better-bred looking": Race and Romance in the Australian Novels of Rosa Praed' JASAL 8 (2008)
 OM81-71 Nora C Murray-Prior Letters 1880-1884, John Oxley Library, State Library of Queensland

1851 births
1935 deaths
19th-century Australian women writers
20th-century Australian women writers
20th-century Australian writers
Australian people of English descent
Australian women novelists
Writers from Queensland
19th-century Australian novelists